Physical culture and sports association "Dynamo" - Ukraine (transliteration: FST "Dynamo" Ukrayiny) or Dynamo - Ukraine is a sports club that was established in the Soviet Union as part of the Soviet sports society "Dynamo". It was created on October 31, 1924 in Kharkiv. Since that time the sports club stays as one of the best clubs in Ukraine after the fall of the Soviet Union.

Among the six existing sports association in Ukraine, Dynamo can be considered the leading. At the 2012 Summer Olympics out of 245 sports people of Ukraine, 125 represented Dynamo. Eighty two sports people represented law enforcement agencies. Forty one out 125 athletes were from the city of Kyiv and Donetsk Oblast. Dynamo's members were honorary national banner carriers for opening and closing ceremonies.

History
The association was established at the constituent conference of delegates from law enforcement agency, state security, border protection and internal troops that took place in Kharkiv on October 31, 1924. Initially Dynamo Kharkiv was sponsored by the Kharkiv factory "Serp i Molot" (Sickle and Mallet) that was recently nationalized and renamed from Gelferikh-Sade. The headquarters of the FST Dynamo became the Illich club at vulytsia Radnarkomivska.

The Kyiv club of Dynamo was initially sponsored by the Bolshevik factory (former - "Greter and Krivanek"). On December 11, 1926 there was established Dynamo Vinnytsia.

During years of independence from 1994 to 2010, 455 sports people represented Dynamo at Olympics and earned 63 different medals (18 gold, 18 silver, 27 bronze). In overall since 1952 the association was represented by 608 athletes 142 of which earned 164 medals (49 gold, 49 silver 66 bronze).

Olympic laureates

1956 Summer Olympics
 Mikhail Shakhov, Kyiv (wrestling)

1968 Summer Olympics
 Aleksei Barkalov, Kharkiv / Kyiv (water polo)

1972 Summer Olympics
 Mykola Avilov, Odessa (decathlon)
 Yakov Zheleznyak, Odessa (shooting)
 Volodymyr Semenets, Volsk (Saratov Oblast) (cycling)
 Aleksei Barkalov, Kharkiv / Kyiv (water polo)
 Kateryna Koryshko, Hadiach Raion (Poltava Oblast) (canoeing)
 Valeriy Borzov, Kyiv (athletics)
 Valeriy Borzov, Kyiv (athletics)
 Valeriy Borzov, Kyiv (athletics)

1976 Summer Olympics
 Nataliya Klymova, Kyiv (basketball)
 Serhiy Novikov, Moscow (judo)
 Serhiy Nahorniy, Khmelnytskyi (canoeing)
 Petro Korol, Lviv (weightlifting)
 Serhiy Nahorniy, Khmelnytskyi (canoeing)
 Mykola Avilov, Odessa (decathlon)
 Valeriy Borzov, Kyiv (athletics)
 Valeriy Borzov, Kyiv (athletics)

1980 Summer Olympics
 Aleksei Barkalov, Kharkiv / Kyiv (water polo)

Sports clubs
 (football) FC Dynamo Kyiv (no longer affiliated), Dynamo Kyiv (women)
 (hockey) HC Sokil Kyiv (no longer affiliated)

Olympic centers
 Sports base "Dynamo", Feodosiya
 Palace of Sports "Dynamo",  Donetsk
 Fitness recreational complex "Dynamo", Zhytomyr
 Sports base "Dynamo", Slavske (Lviv Oblast)
 Sports complex "Dynamo", Lviv
 Ski base, Tokari (Sumy Raion)
 Sports complex "Dynamo", Kharkiv Oblast
 Archery sports base "Dynamo", Nova Kakhovka

References

External links
 Official website
 List of fitness-sports associations at the National Olympic Committee of Ukraine website
 Law of Ukraine on Fitness and Sports
 Dynamo at Ukrainian Soviet Encyclopedia
 List of Olympic centers

Sports clubs established in 1924
Sport societies in Ukraine

Sports societies in the Ukrainian Soviet Socialist Republic
1924 establishments in Ukraine